The Minister of Digital and Economic Affairs of Austria heads the Ministry of Digital and Economic Affairs.

Ministers

Cisleithania

First Republic

Second Republic

See also 
 Ministry of Economy (Austria)
 Ministry of Finance (Austria)

Notes

References 

Economy